Prosser Creek is a former settlement in Nevada County, California. The first appearance is on the von Leicht-Hoffmann Tahoe map of 1874. According to Henry T Williams (1876) a man by that name operated a hotel there in the early days.

References

Former settlements in Nevada County, California
Former populated places in California